Judy at Carnegie Hall is a double-LP (re-released decades later as an extended, two-disc CD) live recording of a concert by Judy Garland at Carnegie Hall in New York, with backing orchestra led by Mort Lindsey. This concert appearance, on the night of Sunday April 23, 1961, has been called "the greatest night in show business history".

Garland's live performances were a big success at the time and her record company wanted to capture that energy onto a recording. The double album became a smash, both critically and commercially.

The album won the Grammy Award for Album of the Year, making Garland the first woman to win the award, and spent thirteen weeks at #1 on the Billboard album chart.

Garland's career had moved from movies in the 1940s to vaudeville and elaborate stage shows in the 1950s. She also suffered from drug and alcohol abuse, and, by 1959, had become overweight and ill and needed extensive medical treatment. After a long convalescence, weight loss, and vocal rest, she returned in 1960 to the concert stage with a simple program of "just Judy," omitting the vaudeville and comic acts that usually preceded her. Garland's 1960–1961 tour of Europe and North America was a success, and her stage presence was highly regarded. At the time Garland was billed as "The World's Greatest Entertainer." Audiences were documented as leaving their seats and crowding around the stage to be closer to Garland, and often called her back for encore after encore, even asking her to repeat a song after her book of arrangements was completed.

Accolades
The double album was an enormous best seller, charting for 73 weeks on the Billboard charts, including 13 weeks at No. 1, and being certified Gold. It won four Grammy Awards, for Album of the Year, Best Female Vocal Performance, Best Engineered Album, and Best Album Cover. The album has never been out of print.

In 2001, after the television miniseries Life with Judy Garland: Me and My Shadows showed Judy Davis recreating Garland's 1961 Carnegie Hall appearance, the album was rereleased in a slightly different form, and it appeared again on the charts, rising to number 20 for internet sales, and number 26 on Billboard's Top Pop Catalog Albums.

In 2003, the album was one of 50 recordings chosen by the Library of Congress to be added to the National Recording Registry.

In June 2006, Rufus Wainwright did his own homage to Garland's night by recreating the concert in its entirety at Carnegie Hall, with Rufus Does Judy at Carnegie Hall, released as an album in December 2007.

Track listing

2001 compact disc release
In 2001, Capitol released Judy at Carnegie Hall as a double Compact Disc set (catalog number 72435-72876-2-3). This edition has the songs in their original running order, and includes material that was not on the original LP set: Garland's monologues and comments to the audience and orchestra; the orchestra preparing for the next number; and a false start on "Come Rain or Come Shine." The CD release purports to reproduce the concert as the Carnegie Hall audience heard it, "warts and all."

Charts

Certifications and sales

References

External links
The Judy Garland Online Discography "Judy At Carnegie Hall" pages.
Library of Congress essay on recordings addition to the National Recording Registry.
 "A Lot to Learn from 'Judy at Carnegie Hall'", David Was, National Public Radio, June 10, 2006.

1961 live albums
Judy Garland live albums
Albums recorded at Carnegie Hall
Capitol Records live albums
Grammy Hall of Fame Award recipients
Grammy Award for Album of the Year
Grammy Award for Best Female Pop Vocal Performance
Grammy Award for Best Engineered Album, Non-Classical
United States National Recording Registry recordings
United States National Recording Registry albums